The 1960 Colorado State Rams football team represented Colorado State University in the Skyline Conference during the 1960 NCAA University Division football season.  In their fifth season under head coach Don Mullison, the Rams compiled a 2–8 record (1–6 against Skyline opponents), finished last in the Skyline Conference, and were outscored by opponents by a total of 240 to 92.

The team's statistical leaders included Jon Crider with 305 passing yards, Brady Keys with 368 rushing yards, and Ward Gates with 209 receiving yards.

Schedule

References

Colorado State
Colorado State Rams football seasons
Colorado State Rams football